Riverside Airport may refer to:

 Riverside Airport (Kansas), a former public use airport in Wichita, Kansas, United States (FAA LID: K32)
 Riverside Municipal Airport, a public use airport in Riverside, California, United States (FAA/IATA: RAL)
 Richard Lloyd Jones Jr. Airport, a public use airport with tower call sign "Riverside", in Tulsa, Oklahoma, United States (FAA/IATA: RVS)
 Meyer Riverside Airpark, a private use airport in Tigard, Oregon, United States (FAA: OG34)